The Smash Brothers is a 2013 nine-part documentary series written and directed by Travis 'Samox' Beauchamp. The documentary series examines the history of the competitive Super Smash Bros. community, in particular the game Super Smash Bros. Melee and seven of the most dominant players throughout its history up to that point: Christopher "Azen" McMullen, Joel "Isai" Alvarado, Ken "Ken" Hoang, Christopher "PC Chris" Szygiel, Daniel "KoreanDJ" Jung, Jason "Mew2King" Zimmerman, and Joseph "Mango" Marquez. The film also features extensive commentary from other community figures including Chris "Wife" Fabiszak, Wynton "Prog" Smith, Kashan "Chillindude" Khan, Antoine "Wes" Lewis-Hall, Daniel "ChuDat" Rodriguez, Juan "Hungrybox" Debiedma, and Lillian "Milktea" Chen. The series was crowdfunded through Kickstarter, receiving US$8,910. The series had a total budget of US$12,000. The series has received a combined total of over 4 million views on YouTube.

Overview
The documentary is split into nine parts in chronological order, with each part except the first and the last profiling a notable Melee player.

Development
Beauchamp played Smash Bros. from an early age, and was inspired to create the documentary series after learning about the lives of professional players.
The pilot episode was shot in the summer of 2011. The documentary took over two years to make. Beauchamp quit his job to work on it full-time. He was able to interview all of the players he profiled in the series except for Azen.

Reception and legacy
The documentary series was well received by fans and game critics alike who praised its high production value, unusual for most fan films.

The documentary has been credited with leading to a renewed interest in competitive Melee tournaments. Due to the success of the series, Samox announced a spin-off documentary called Metagame, set to expand on the stories of Swedish smasher, Adam "Armada" Lindgren, America's Kevin "PPMD" Nanney, and others, The documentary premiered on a Twitch livestream from December 11–13, 2020.

References

External links

American documentary films
American film series
Super Smash Bros.
Esports films
Documentary films about video games
Films shot in New Jersey
Films shot in California
Films shot in Massachusetts
Films shot in Indiana
Crowdfunded films